Leapfrog is a children's game in which players vault over each other's stooped backs.

History 
Games of this sort have been called by this name since at least the late sixteenth century.

Rules 
The first participant rests their hands on knees and bends over, which is called giving a back. The next player places hands on the first's back and leaps over by straddling legs wide apart on each side. On landing he stoops down and a third leaps over the first and second, and the fourth over all others successively. When all the players are stooping, the last in the line begins leaping over all the others in turn. The number of participants is not fixed.

Variations 
The French version of this game is called saute-mouton (literally "leapsheep"), and the Romanian is called capra ("mounting rack" or "goat"). In India it is known as "Aar Ghodi Ki Par Ghodi" (meaning "horseleap"). In Italy the game is called "la cavallina" (i.e. "small or baby female horse"). In Dutch it is called "bokspringen" (literally "goatjumping"; a 'bok' is a male goat) or "haasje-over" (literally "hare-over").

In China this game is known as "跳山羊"(literally "leap goat"), which is played in pairs. One player, acting as "the goat", leaps over the back of the other player, who plays the role of "the rock/mountain". Then they switch roles, and "the rock" rises a bit  each time they switch. Both players continue playing until one "goat" fails leaping "the rock/mountain" as the result of its rising. In the Filipino culture, a similar game is called luksóng báka (literally "leap cow"), in which the "it" rests his hands on his knees and bends over, and then the other players—in succession—place their hands on the back of the “it” and leaps over by straddling legs wide apart on each side; whoever's legs touch any part of the body of the “it” becomes the next “it.”   
In the Korean and Japanese versions (말뚝박기 lit. "piledriving" and 馬跳び うまとび umatobi, lit. "horseleap", respectively), one player 'leaps' over the backs of the other players who stoop close enough to form a continuous line, attempting to cause the line to collapse under the weight of the riders.

References

External links

Children's games